Nightmares is the debut studio album by British metalcore band Architects. It was released on 15 May 2006 through Distort and In at the Deep End Records. The album was produced by the band themselves and Karl Bareham. It is the only album featuring the band's original line-up with Matt Johnson on vocals and Tim Lucas on bass.

Track listing

Personnel
Architects
 Matt Johnson – lead vocals
 Tom Searle – lead guitar, keyboards, programming
 Tim Hillier-Brook – rhythm guitar
 Tim Lucas – bass
 Dan Searle – drums, percussion, programming

Additional personnel
 Architects – production
 Karl Bareham – production, mixing, mastering, recording

References

2006 debut albums
Architects (British band) albums
Distort Entertainment albums